Tropical Storm Vamco was a weak tropical cyclone which affected Indochina in mid-September 2015. Formed from a tropical disturbance on September 13, the system developed into a tropical storm and reached its peak intensity on September 14. Vamco made landfall in Vietnam and affected Laos, Thailand and Cambodia. The storm caused flooding in these countries and damages amounted to US$14.1 million. Fifteen people died in the floods.

Heavy rains caused by the storm in Central Vietnam ended the drought in this area, after many hot days because of the  strong El Niño.

Meteorological history 

At this time fragmented bands of atmospheric convection were trying to form around the system's low level circulation centre, which was located within a marginal environment for further development. Over the next couple of days the system gradually developed further, before it was classified as a tropical depression during September 13, by both the Japan Meteorological Agency and the United States Joint Typhoon Warning Center. With flaring deep convection surrounding its LLCC, the JTWC started issuing bulletins and was assigned the designation 19W. Thereafter, both the JMA and the JTWC upgraded 19W to a tropical storm, naming it Vamco. On September 14, deep convection slightly weakened and became displaced near its center, however the environment was still favorable at this moment. A few hours later, the JTWC reported that according to animations, the center of Vamco had become partially exposed and wind shear inhibited further development, which favorable conditions started to fade. Therefore, the JTWC issued its final warning. Vamco made landfall south of Da Nang, Vietnam, and the system was last noted as it dissipated over land on September 15.

Impact 
The outer bands of Vamco affected Hainan, causing a damage of ¥2 million (US$314,000) in economic losses.

On September 14, before Vamco made landfall, Da Nang suffered some damage from the storm. Over 500 trees were downed in this city and dozens of flights were cancelled.

Vamco made landfall in Quảng Nam Province, causing floods in central Vietnam.
Flooding in Vietnam killed 11 people. Losses to fisheries in the Lý Sơn District exceeded ₫1 billion (US$45,000). Damage to the power grid in Vietnam reached ₫4.9 billion (US$218,000). In Quảng Nam Province, Vamco caused moderate damage. In Duy Xuyên District, agricultural losses exceeded ₫2 billion (US$89,000) and in Nông Sơn District total damage amounted to ₫1 billion (US$45,000). Officials in Thanh Hóa Province estimated total damages from the flooding by the storm had reached ₫287 billion (US$12.8 million). Heavy rains caused by the storm in Central Vietnam ended the drought in this area, after many hot days due to the strong El Niño.

Flooding in Cambodia affected thousands of residents and prompted numerous evacuations. The remnants of Vamco triggered flooding in 15 provinces across Thailand and killed two people. At least 480 homes were damaged and losses exceeded ฿20 million (US$556,000). Two fishermen died after their boat sank during the storm off the Ban Laem District while a third remains missing.

See also 

 September 2009 Vietnam tropical depression
 Tropical Depression 18W (2013)
 Typhoon Rai
 Typhoon Nari (2013)
 Tropical Storm Aere (2016)

Notes

References

External links 

JMA General Information of Tropical Storm Vamco (1519) from Digital Typhoon
JMA Best Track Data of Tropical Storm Vamco (1519) 

19W.VAMCO from the U.S. Naval Research Laboratory

2015 Pacific typhoon season
Typhoons in Vietnam
Vamco